Hellacious Acres: The Case of John Glass is a 2011 Canadian science fiction comedy film directed by Pat Tremblay, starring Navin Pratap.

Cast
 Navin Pratap as John Glass
 jamie Abrams as Jamie Walker
 Paula Davis

Release
The film was acquired by The Collective and Bloody Disgusting in August 2011 for a theatrical, VOD and DVD release. The film was released on DVD, VOD and became available for Digital Download on 3 April 2012.

Reception
Evil Andy of Dread Central gave the film a rating of 3.5 out of 5, and writing that while the film "is certainly long and painful as intended", it "is also side-splittingly funny and that the grind is thoroughly entertaining." Shelagh Rowan-Legg of ScreenAnarchy wrote a positive review of the film, writing that "the entire composition of the film is well-conceived and deliberate in appearance and execution." The Montreal Gazette wrote that "Even though the situation that John Glass finds himself in is absurd in many ways, it  also seems all too plausible, based on past and present experience."

The film received a negative review in HorrorNews.net.

References

External links
 
 

Canadian science fiction comedy films
2010s science fiction comedy films
2010s Canadian films
2011 films